Pisang Island (Pulau Pisang) may refer to:

 Pisang Island (Maluku), one of the Banda Islands in Maluku Province, Indonesia
 Pisang Island (Lampung), in Lampung Province, Indonesia
 Pisang Island (Johor), situated off the western coast of the Malaysian state of Johor
 Pisang Island Lighthouse